This is an incomplete list of notable drivers that have made at least one start in Champ Car racing.  Drivers are listed under only one era, even if their careers spanned more than one.

Drivers

AAA era (1902–1955)

USAC era (1956–1978)

CART era (1979–2003)

CCWS (Champ Car World Series) era (2004–2007)

See also 

 List of Champ Car circuits
 List of fatal Champ Car accidents
 List of Champ Car pole positions
 List of Champ Car teams
 List of Champ Car winners

 List of IndyCar Series drivers

Drivers
Champ Car